Pauperism (Lat. pauper, poor) is poverty or generally the state of being poor, or particularly the condition of being a "pauper", i.e. receiving relief administered under the English Poor Laws. From this, pauperism can also be more generally the state of being supported at public expense, within or outside of almshouses, and still more generally, of dependence for any considerable period on charitable assistance, public or private. In this sense pauperism is to be distinguished from poverty.

Under the English Poor Laws, a person to be relieved must be a destitute person, and the moment he had been relieved he became a pauper, and as such incurred certain civil disabilities. Statistics dealing with the state of pauperism in this sense convey not the amount of destitution actually prevalent, but the particulars of people in receipt of poor law relief.

The 1830s brought to Europe great economic hardships. The late 19th century saw a tremendous rise in the populations of all the European countries. This resulted in more job seekers than emplacement. Populations from rural areas migrated to bigger towns to live in overcrowded slums. Small producers in town faced tough competition from cheap imported goods in England. The rise of food prices led to widespread pauperism.

Poverty in the interwar years (1918–1939) was responsible for several measures which largely killed off the Poor Law system. The Local Government Act 1929 officially abolished workhouses, and between 1929 and 1930 the Poor Law Guardians, the "workhouse test," and the term "pauper" disappeared.

See also 
Debtors Anonymous
Pauper's funeral
Reserve army of labour
Social exclusion
Social stigma
The Prince and the Pauper
Working poor

References

Further reading 

English Poor Laws